Gordon Mackay is a  former wrestler from New Zealand.

He won the bronze medal at the 1970 British Commonwealth Games in the men's 74 kg event. Four years later at the 1974 British Commonwealth Games he repeated the feat, again winning the bronze medal.

References

Commonwealth Games bronze medallists for New Zealand
Wrestlers at the 1970 British Commonwealth Games
Wrestlers at the 1974 British Commonwealth Games
Living people
New Zealand male sport wrestlers
Commonwealth Games medallists in wrestling
Year of birth missing (living people)
Medallists at the 1970 British Commonwealth Games
Medallists at the 1974 British Commonwealth Games